Christian Bach (born 22 March 1979) is a German former professional racing cyclist. He most notably won the silver medal in the team pursuit at the 2002 UCI Track Cycling World Championships as well as a bronze medal in the same event the previous year.

Major results

1997
 UCI Junior Track World Championships
2nd  Team pursuit
3rd  Individual pursuit
1999
 1st  Team pursuit, National Track Championships
2001
 1st  Team pursuit, National Track Championships
 3rd  Team pursuit, UCI Track World Championships
2002
 2nd  Team pursuit, UCI Track World Championships
2003
 1st  Team pursuit, National Track Championships
 2nd  Team pursuit – Moscow, UCI World Cup Classics
2004
 1st  Team pursuit, National Track Championships
2005
 3rd  Team pursuit – Manchester, 2004–05 UCI World Cup Classics

References

External links
 

1979 births
Living people
German male cyclists
German track cyclists
People from Meiningen
Cyclists from Thuringia
People from Bezirk Suhl